Repacholi is a surname. Notable people with the surname include:

 Daniel Repacholi (born 1982), Australian sport shooter and politician
 Michael Repacholi (born 1944), Australian biophysicist and radiation protection expert

See also
 Tony Rapacioli, English DJ